Lecky is a surname. Notable people with the surname include:

 John Lecky (1940–2003), Canadian rower
 John Lecky (rugby union, born 1863), New Zealand rugby union player
 John Lecky (rugby union, born 1960), Canadian rugby union player
 Prescott Lecky (1892–1941), American psychologist
 William Edward Hartpole Lecky (1838-1903), Anglo-Irish historian

See also
 Leckie, a surname